Upsettington Castle was a castle that was located near Upsettington (now Ladykirk), Scottish Borders, Scotland. The castle was the caput baronium of the Lordship of Upsettlington. The lands and barony was granted to the Bisset family by King William I of Scotland. Upsettlington was strategically located adjacent to the English Norham Castle across the River Tweed. The castle was sacked and destroyed in 1297–1298, while William Bisset, Lord of Upsettlington was in Flanders serving in King Edward I of England's expedition to Flanders.

Citations

References 
 King, Andy & Simpkin, David (2012); "England and Scotland at War, c.1296-c.1513 - History of Warfare", Brill. 

Castles in the Scottish Borders
Buildings and structures in the Scottish Borders
Demolished buildings and structures in Scotland
Former castles in Scotland
Clan Bissett